The World Awards were founded by the writer Georg Kindel; Mikhail Gorbachev is their president. An international jury selects extraordinary individuals for their achievements in a variety of areas such as acting, arts, business, media, health and others.

The first World Awards were held in November 2000 at the Imperial Hofburg Palace in Vienna, Austria; the fourth World Awards 2003 were hosted in Hamburg, Germany.

See also
Men's World Day

External links

Official Website (archived)

 International awards
 Awards established in 2000